Nikolskoye is a rural locality (a selo) in Kuyagansky Selsoviet, Altaysky District, Altai Krai, Russia. The population was 34 as of 2013. There are 3 streets.

Geography 
Nikolskoye is located on the Barancha River, 38 km southwest of Altayskoye (the district's administrative centre) by road. Kuyagan is the nearest rural locality.

References 

Rural localities in Altaysky District, Altai Krai